Andrew av Fløtum (born 13 June 1979) is a Faroese football striker, currently playing for Faroe Islands Premier League Football team HB Tórshavn.

Club career
He made his debut in Faroese football with HB Tórshavn as a midfielder in the 1996 season and later became a striker. In 2002, he became the league top goalscorer with 18 goals. After winning the player of the year award in 2003, he earned himself a move to Danish club Fremad Amager and spent 4 years in Denmark. He returned to HB in 2007.

International career
Andrew av Fløtum made his debut for the Faroe Islands in a January 2001 friendly match against Sweden, coming on as a substitute for Uni Arge. He has collected 35 caps since, scoring 1 goal.

International goals
Scores and results list Faroe Islands' goal tally first.

Personal life
Besides playing football, Andrew works in a school for children with physical and mental disabilities. He is married and has three daughters.

References

External links
 

1979 births
Living people
Faroese footballers
Faroe Islands international footballers
Havnar Bóltfelag players
People from Tórshavn
Association football forwards
Faroe Islands youth international footballers
Fremad Amager players